Neofaculta is a genus of moth in the family Gelechiidae.

Species
Neofaculta confidella (Rebel, 1936)
Neofaculta ericetella
Neofaculta infernella
Neofaculta taigana Ponomarenko, 1998

Former species
Neofaculta quinquemaculella (Bruand, 1859)

References

External links
 Neofaculta at funet

Chelariini